Stanley Bate (12 December 1911 – 19 October 1959) was an English composer and pianist.

Life
Bate was born in Milehouse, Devonshire, a suburb of Plymouth, and received his first musical education from local teachers. He took to the piano early and by the age of 12 had secured a post as organist at Herbert Street Methodist Church in Devonport. His first opera, The Forest Enchanted, was completed in 1928 when he was 17, and produced locally with Bate conducting. Winning a scholarship to the Royal College of Music, he studied under Ralph Vaughan Williams, R.O. Morris, Gordon Jacob, and Arthur Benjamin. Compositions from this time include the String Quartet No 1 (1936) and the Symphony No 1 in Eb, which was first performed at the College in 1936. He went on to study abroad, for two years, first in Paris with Nadia Boulanger and then in Berlin with Paul Hindemith.

On his return to the UK in 1937 Bate was commissioned to compose the Concertino for piano and chamber orchestra, performed at the Eastbourne Music Festival in February 1938 with Frederic Lamond as the soloist, conducted by Kneale Kelly. Bate also began writing incidental music for theatre director Michel Saint-Denis (including productions of Twelfth Night and The Cherry Orchard) and produced two ballet scores - Perseus  for Les Trois Arts and Cap Over Mill, for Ballet Rambert.

While at the College Bate met Australian-born fellow student and composer Peggy Glanville-Hicks. Although Bate was openly homosexual they married in 1938 and remained together until a divorce in 1949. She was very supportive of his career, at some cost to her own. There were also reports of domestic violence. After the divorce Bate married the Brazilian diplomat Margarida Guedes Nogueira.

At the outbreak of war Bate embarked on British Council funded tours of the US, Australia and Brazil, promoting British culture. With Glanville-Hicks he moved to America in 1941 and saw great successes there, including a performance in February 1942 at Carnegie Hall of his Second Piano Concerto by the New York Philharmonic Orchestra conducted by Thomas Beecham with the composer as soloist. A grant by the Guggenheim Foundation in April 1942 helped with funding. Other successful US premieres included the Sinfonietta No 1 in 1942 (ISCM, Berkeley California), the String Quartet No 2, given by the Lener Quartet in 1943, and the Viola Concerto in 1946, performed by Emanuel Vardi with the NBC Symphony Orchestra.

Returning to the UK in 1949 (via Brusssels and Paris), Bate found it hard to replicate his international successes at home. However, the Violin Concerto No 3 (1947–50) received a successful performance at the Royal Festival Hall with the London Symphony Orchestra and Antonio Brosa soloist in 1953. The premiere of the Symphony No 3 at the Cheltenham Festival in 1954 - some fourteen years after its completion - was unanimously well received by critics. The Musical Times called it "exhilarating, hard-hitting music". The BBC has been criticised for its lack of support for his music, but it did stage the world premiere of his Piano Concerto No 3 at the Proms on 30 August 1957 with the composer as soloist and Malcolm Sargent conducting the BBC Symphony Orchestra. And the first broadcast of the Symphony No 4 was given on 3 April 1958 by the BBC Northern Orchestra, conducted by Lawrence Leonard.

Short of money and depressed by his lack of recognition, Bate died in 1959 aged 47, having suffered a breakdown a few months before. The coroner's verdict was death due to complications of alcohol, though other reports suggested a drug overdose.

Music
The music of Stanley Bate quickly fell into obscurity following his death. The Third Symphony (1940) was long regarded as his best work in his home country, although critics were quick to point out its influences. "The second subject of the first movement is almost pure Vaughan Williams, the slow movement almost pure Hindemith, and Boulanger's influence may be detected in the Stravinskian rhythms of the last movement", wrote the Manchester Guardian critic. The opening of Walton's landmark Symphony No 1, which preceded it by five years, can also be heard in the opening figures of the finale. Mark Lehman described the work as "very much a 'war symphony' with kinships to the contemporaneous symphonies of Arthur Benjamin, Richard Arnell and Bernard Herrmann". There was a further performance of the Third Symphony at Cheltenham in 1965, but it took until 2006 for a new performance to be broadcast, followed by a commercial recording in 2010.

That same year a recording of the Viola Concerto (1944-6) by Roger Chase and the BBC Concert Orchestra conducted by Stephen Bell helped spark a modern revival of interest. This intensively lyrical work also immediately brings to mind the music of Vaughan Williams, to whom it is dedicated. Recordings of the Symphony No 4 (1954–55) followed in 2011, and the Third Piano Concerto (1938) and Sinfonietta No 1 (1940) in 2012. A recording of the Cello Concerto (1954) was issued by Lyrita in 2015.

Works

References

External links
 Barlow, Michael and Barnett Robert. Stanley Bate, Forgotten International Composer at MusicWeb International
 BBC Radio 3 Documentary: The Lonely Death of Stanley Bate, 2 February 2020
 Stanley Bate archive, Royal College of Music

1911 births
1959 deaths
1959 suicides
20th-century British male musicians
20th-century British musicians
20th-century classical composers
20th-century classical pianists
20th-century English composers
20th-century English LGBT people
British male pianists
English classical composers
English classical pianists
English male classical composers
English gay musicians
LGBT classical composers
Male classical pianists